The 1975 Chicago Cubs season was the 104th season of the Chicago Cubs franchise, the 100th in the National League and the 60th at Wrigley Field. The Cubs finished fifth in the National League East with a record of 75–87.

Offseason 
 October 23, 1974: Billy Williams was traded by the Cubs to the Oakland Athletics for Manny Trillo, Darold Knowles and Bob Locker.
 December 2, 1974: Tim Hosley was selected by the Cubs from the Oakland Athletics in the rule 5 draft.
 December 13, 1974: Carmen Fanzone was released by the Cubs.
 January 9, 1975: Ed Putman was drafted by the Cubs in the 1st round (3rd pick) of the 1975 Major League Baseball draft (Secondary Phase).

Regular season 
 April 25, 1975: Rick Reuschel had three putouts in one inning for the Cubs.

Season standings

Record vs. opponents

Notable transactions 
 April 6, 1975: Jim Todd was traded by the Cubs to the Oakland Athletics for a player to be named later and cash. The Athletics completed the deal by sending Champ Summers to the Cubs on April 29.
 May 2, 1975: Burt Hooton was traded by the Cubs to the Los Angeles Dodgers for Geoff Zahn and Eddie Solomon.
 June 3, 1975: Lee Smith was drafted by the Cubs in the 2nd round of the 1975 amateur draft. Player signed June 20, 1975.
 July 22, 1975: Eddie Solomon was traded by the Cubs to the St. Louis Cardinals for Ken Crosby.

Roster

Player stats

Batting

Starters by position 
Note: Pos = Position; G = Games played; AB = At bats; H = Hits; Avg. = Batting average; HR = Home runs; RBI = Runs batted in

Other batters 
Note: G = Games played; AB = At bats; H = Hits; Avg. = Batting average; HR = Home runs; RBI = Runs batted in

Pitching

Starting pitchers 
Note: G = Games pitched; IP = Innings pitched; W = Wins; L = Losses; ERA = Earned run average; SO = Strikeouts

Other pitchers 
Note: G = Games pitched; IP = Innings pitched; W = Wins; L = Losses; ERA = Earned run average; SO = Strikeouts

Relief pitchers 
Note: G = Games pitched; W = Wins; L = Losses; SV = Saves; ERA = Earned run average; SO = Strikeouts

Farm system 

LEAGUE CO-CHAMPIONS: Midland

Notes

References 

1975 Chicago Cubs season at Baseball Reference

Chicago Cubs seasons
Chicago Cubs season
Chicago Cubs